Spirit Of The Irish: Ultimate Collection is an album by The Dubliners which charted at No. 19 in the UK Album Charts in 2003.

Track listing
 The Irish Rover (with The Pogues)  
 The Rocky Road To Dublin  
 McAlpine's Fusiliers  
 Seven Drunken Nights  
 The Fields Of Athenry  
 The Wild Rover  
 Dicey Reilly  
 Black Velvet Band  
 The Auld Triangle  
 The Marino Waltz (instrumental)  
 Maids When You're Young (Never Wed An Old Man)  
 Whiskey In The Jar  
 Finnegan's Wake  
 Carrickfergus  
 Monto  
 The Mason's Apron (Instrumental)  
 Dirty Old Town  
 Ragman's Ball  
 The Mountain Dew (with The Pogues)  
 The Town I Loved So Well

Chart performance

References

2003 compilation albums
The Dubliners compilation albums